Emanuel and the Fear is the first EP from Brooklyn-based symphonic rock band Emanuel and the Fear and was released via Paper Garden Records in February 2009.

Reception
Following their first release, the band was included in The L Magazine's list of "8 NYC Bands You Need to Hear" where they described the EP by saying: "The songs are based in the pop tradition, with melody proudly taking center stage, but the tidy and immaculately composed classical arrangements and the subtle electronic flourishes give the whole thing a much grander feel that immediately drives home the point that these folks can’t be contained by small stages for very long, neither literally nor figuratively. "

In popular media
The song Comfortable Prison was used in an episode of the MTV reality show 16 & Pregnant.

The song, "The Rain Becomes the Clouds", was featured in the episode "Movie Night" of the ABC Family show Huge.

Track listing

 "The Rain Becomes the Clouds" 03:40
 "Comfortable Prison" 04:12
 "Jimme's Song" 07:58
 "We're All Alright Tonight" 04:23
 "Two" 04:27

Personnel
 Emanuel Ayvas - synth, guitar, piano, vocals
 Tom Swafford - violin
 Brian Sanders - cello
 Jeff Gretz - drums
 Dallin Applebaum - vocals, organ, synth
 Liz Hanley - vocals
 Colin Dean - bass
 Nic Cowles - flute
 Chris Colletti - trumpet
 David Nelson - trombone
 Dan Tirer - guitar
 Deantoni Parks - drums
 Jamin Gilbert - turntables, programming

References

2009 EPs
Emanuel and the Fear albums